The 1980 Fischer-Grand Prix was a men's tennis tournament played on indoor hard courts at the Wiener Stadthalle in Vienna, Austria that was part of the 1980 Volvo Grand Prix. It was the sixth edition of the tournament and was held from 20 October until 26 October 1980. First-seeded Brian Gottfried won the singles title, his second at the event after 1977.

Finals

Singles

 Brian Gottfried defeated  Trey Waltke 6–2, 6–4, 6–3
 It was Gottfried's 8th title of the year and the 66th of his career.

Doubles

 Robert Lutz /  Stan Smith defeated  Heinz Günthardt /  Pavel Složil 6–1, 6–2
 It was Lutz's 7th title of the year and the 49th of his career. It was Smith's 6th title of the year and the 86th of his career.

References

External links
 ATP tournament profile
 ITF tournament edition details

 
Fischer-Grand Prix
Vienna Open